Volume 2 is the eleventh studio album by the Bouncing Souls. It was released on October 23, 2020 and was recorded in the days leading up to the 2020 COVID-19 lockdown. The album contains 10 songs from their previous albums re-recorded in new styles, along with a new song, "World on Fire".

Background
In 2019, The Bouncing Souls started to play acoustic sets before their live concerts to celebrate their 30th anniversary.  Inspired by the positive reception of these performances, the band teamed up with engineer and producer Will Yip, with whom they collaborated on their previous EP, to record a studio album of the acoustic renditions.  However, while in the studio, the band improvised different approaches to their songs and the styles of the recordings grew from the acoustic style originally performed live.

Track listing

Personnel
Adapted from the liner notes.

Musicians
 Greg Attonito – vocals
 Pete Steinkopf – guitar, backing vocals
 Bryan Kienlen – bass, backing vocals
 George Rebelo – drums, percussion, backing vocals
 Shelley Weiss – cello, backing vocals 

Artwork
 Bryan Kienlen – cover
 Chris Napolitano – photography
 George Rebelo – photography
 Josh Casuccio – photography

Production
 Hank Byerley – production
 Will Yip – production, engineering, mastering, mixing

Charts

References

The Bouncing Souls albums
2020 albums
Albums produced by Will Yip
Pure Noise Records albums